Brother Rabbit Speaks is the debut album by American singer/songwriter Peter Mulvey, released in 1992. It was reissued in 2001 by Signature Sounds.

Reception

Writing for Allmusic, critic Evan Cator praised Mulvey's guitar playing, but criticized his songwriting, writing, "the songs are generally ramblingly wordy lyrics slung haphazardly into semi-melodies that get lost in the intricate guitar work. At times one gets the impression that Mulvey was attempting some sort of jazz-folk hybrid, but he seems to have appropriated only the most self-indulgent and careless qualities of jazz. It doesn't help that he didn't yet have much control over his singing voice... The album will only be of interest to the artist's most devoted followers."

Track listing
All songs by Peter Mulvey.
"The Tree" – 4:45
"Rain Dog" – 3:59
"Black Rabbit" – 3:22
"Train Bound for Evermore" – 6:14
"The Moon of the Geese Losing Their Feathers" – 4:26
"Midwife" – 4:10
"The Weremoose" – 3:48
"Juda" – 6:01
"Rain Song" – 3:15
"Imamu" – 3:41
"The Voice" – 1:07
"September Dawn" – 4:07

Personnel
Peter Mulvey – vocals, guitar, flute, drums, bass
Rick Bauer – accordion
Mary Gaines – cello
Charles Schulz – bass
Pamela Means – guitar, vocals
Frank Mulvey – percussion
Scott Thom – percussion

References

Peter Mulvey albums
1992 debut albums